Huckleberry Finn is a 1974 musical film version of  Mark Twain's 1884 novel The Adventures of Huckleberry Finn.

The movie was produced by Reader's Digest and Arthur P. Jacobs (known for his role in the production of the Planet of the Apes films) and directed by J. Lee Thompson. It stars Jeff East as Huckleberry Finn and Paul Winfield as Jim. The film contains original music and songs, such as "Freedom" and "Cairo, Illinois",  by the Sherman Brothers: Richard M. Sherman and Robert B. Sherman.

This film followed the previous year's highly successful Tom Sawyer, based on Twain's 1876 novel The Adventures of Tom Sawyer, also produced and written by the same team and starring East in the role of Huckleberry Finn.

Synopsis
Huckleberry Finn (Jeff East) is a boy from Missouri living with a kindly widow and her sister who has taken him in. One day his father (Gary Merrill), previously thought dead, shows up because he heard of treasure Huck had found. Huck's father essentially kidnaps the boy, wanting $1,000 for his safe return. Staging his own death, Huck escapes and meets up with the kindly slave Jim (Paul Winfield). Together they travel downriver, in search of Jim's freedom.

Cast
 Jeff East as Huckleberry Finn
 Paul Winfield as Jim
 Harvey Korman as The King
 David Wayne as The Duke
 Arthur O'Connell as Col. Grangerford
 Gary Merrill as Pap
 Natalie Trundy as Mrs. Loftus
 Lucille Benson as Widow Douglas
 Kim O'Brien as Maryjane Wilks
 Jean Fay as Susan Wilks
 Ruby Leftwich as Miss Watson
 Odessa Cleveland as Jim's wife

Production
The film was a sequel to Tom Sawyer, which was financed from United Artists and Reader's Digest. Even before that film had been released, producer Arthur Jacobs arranged for finance for a sequel based on Huckleberry Finn. The director was J. Lee Thompson, with whom Jacobs had worked several times, most recently on two Planet of the Apes films.

Paul Winfield said he would only agree to the movie if the producer and director would guarantee there would be no "singing slaves". "Gone with the Wind was one of the traumas of my life," said Winfield.

Like Tom Sawyer, the film was shot in Arrow Rock and Lupus, Missouri. It was also shot in Natchez, Mississippi. Filming started 18 June 1973.

Filming had only just began when Arthur Jacobs died of a heart attack in Los Angeles. Robert Blumofe was assigned to take over time. Filming resumed after the break of one day. Natalie Trundy, Jacobs' wife, had a role in the film and had to fly back to Los Angeles then return to location.

Paul Winfield was arrested for possession of marijuana in his hotel room. (He claimed he had been sent it in the mail and was framed.) Thompson said the treatment by Winfield of the local police was "abominable" and that "I would never encourage a company to come to Natchez again." This comment upset the Natchez media who wrote articles critical of Thompson. Thompson retracted his comments about the town but maintained the police had shown prejudice towards Winfield.

Director J. Lee Thompson had problems with the synchronized musical direction. The third major problem was the unfortunate timing of writer Robert B. Sherman's knee operation.

Roberta Flack sang "Freedom" but insisted on having a guitar backing to her recording. She later threatened to sue if the original cast album was released with a dominant orchestral backing, and so although the album was recorded and printed, it was never released.

Despite these setbacks, the film still achieved some success and some of the film's songs, including "Freedom", are still considered classics.

Songs
The songs and score were written by the Sherman Brothers.  
 "Freedom". Sung by Roberta Flack (who did not approve of the musical arrangement and threatened a lawsuit if the original cast album were not remixed to her liking).
 "Someday, Honey Darlin'". Sung by Paul Winfield.  
 "Rotten Luck". Sung by Gary Merrill (the entire song was filmed sans-sync except for the final line of the song in which we see Merrill look back at the cabin and say, "And now my luck... It ain't so bad!"). 
 "Cairo, Illinois". Sung by Jeff East and Paul Winfield. 
 "A Rose In A Bible".
 "Royalty!". Sung by Harvey Korman and David Wayne.
 "The Royal Nonesuch". Sung by Harvey Korman.
 "What's Right, What's Wrong?" Sung by Jeff East. 
 "Into His Hands". Sung by Harvey Korman.

Reception
The Los Angeles Times called it "hardly unpleasant but it is surprisingly dull." The New York Times called it "a lavish bore".

See also
 List of films featuring slavery

References

Bibliography
 Sherman, Robert B. Walt's Time: from before to beyond. Pages: 178–181, Santa Clarita: Camphor Tree Publishers, 1998.

External links 
 
 

1974 films
United Artists films
Musicals by the Sherman Brothers
1970s musical films
1974 musical films
Reader's Digest
Films based on Adventures of Huckleberry Finn
Films directed by J. Lee Thompson
Films set in the 19th century
1970s English-language films